The Professional Women's Hockey Players Association (PWHPA) is a nonprofit 501(c)(6) organization dedicated to advocating for the promotion of professional women's ice hockey. It was founded in May 2019 following the dissolution of the Canadian Women's Hockey League, which only paid stipends, and player's dissatisfaction in the operations of the National Women's Hockey League. Their goal is to create a sustainable professional league for women's ice hockey in North America.

History
Historically, women's ice hockey leagues have been strictly amateur, providing no pay or other incentives. Participation grew and women's competitions were eventually added by the International Ice Hockey Federation in 1990 and the Olympics in 1998. Several semi-professional leagues then appeared in Canada and the United States, including the Canadian Women's Hockey League (CWHL) in 2007. The CWHL called itself a professional level league, but the league only paid for travel, ice rental and uniform costs, plus some equipment, and did not pay players. From 2011 to 2015, the CWHL was the only organized women's senior ice hockey league in North America.

In 2015, the National Women's Hockey League (NWHL) was launched in the United States and was the first women's ice hockey league to pay its players, although it was still not considered a livable wage. In 2017, the CWHL followed suit and began paying its players a stipend.

Following the 2018–19 season, the CWHL ceased operations citing the fragmentation of corporate sponsors between the CWHL and NWHL, lack of viewership, and reduced revenue from a partnership in China caused their league to be financially infeasible. On May 2, 2019, over 200 players from both the CWHL and NWHL released a joint statement announcing their intent to not participate in any North American professional league for the 2019–20 season citing their dissatisfaction in the operations of both leagues in that neither provided health insurance or a livable salary. The NWHL responded with that they were pursuing many more sponsors than in previous years and hoped to increase player salaries. and agreed to give players a 50 percent split of revenue on league sponsorship and media deals. On May 20, 2019, the players formed a non-profit called the Professional Women's Hockey Players Association (PWHPA) to further push for their stated goals of a league that provides financial and infrastructure resources to players, health insurance, and support to training programs for young female players. With a large number of North American players boycotting the NWHL, more than half of the signed players on opening rosters for the 2019–20 NWHL season were new to the league.

In December 2019, the ECHL partnered with the PWHPA and chose four members to participate in the January 2020 ECHL All-Star Game with Dani Cameranesi, Kali Flanagan, Gigi Marvin, and Annie Pankowski each assigned to one of the four teams. The 2020 NHL All-Star Game also expanded its inclusion of female skaters from previous seasons to a full three-on-three exhibition game between teams composed of American and Canadian women's players. Eighteen of the 20 players were active PWHPA members and the event was supported by the PWHPA, but it was not directly in partnership with the association.

Jordan Juron was the first PWHPA member to "defect" and rejoin the NWHL, signing with the Boston Pride in January 2020.

In March 2020, the PWHPA partnered with the Arizona Coyotes of the National Hockey League (NHL) for their sixth Dream Gap Tour stop in Tempe, Arizona. In 2021, the New York Rangers became the first NHL team to host a PWHPA game on February 28, 2021, at Madison Square Garden. The PWHPA announced they will also be partnering with the Toronto Maple Leafs hosting a game and the team providing marketing assistance and sponsorship consultation services.

List of PWHPA seasons  
 2019–20 PWHPA season
 2020–21 PWHPA season

Leadership
Through the services of attorneys from Ballard Spahr, LLP, who provided pro bono support to help create the PWHPA, nine players make up a group of player representatives that are part of the board membership: Jocelyne Lamoureux-Davidson, Alyssa Gagliardi, Brianne Jenner, Hilary Knight, Sarah Nurse, Noora Räty, Kimberly Sass, Kendall Coyne Schofield, and Shannon Szabados. Seven individuals serve in consulting capacities, making up the support team, while five attorneys from Ballard Spahr comprise the legal team: Conrad Bower, Kimberly Magrini, Dee Spagnuolo, John Langel and Chris Cognato.

PWHPA-NWHL/PHF relations  
After the formation of the National Women's Hockey League (NWHL) in 2015, relations between the NWHL and the CWHL had been strained, a situation that continued after the CWHL collapsed and most of its players joined the PWHPA.  Multiple PWHPA players raised concerns over a perceived lack of professionalism and sub-standard conditions within the NWHL, with American Olympian Hilary Knight stating that the NWHL was "a glorified beer league". Other PWHPA players have stated that they disagree with the NWHL's approach to growing women's hockey, calling for a less incremental approach. Many players also cited they wanted the National Hockey League to further support women's professional hockey, but the Buffalo Sabres and New Jersey Devils had severed their affiliations with NWHL teams in 2019.

NWHL commissioner Dani Rylan was sometimes cited as a point of contention, with NWHLPA chair Anya Packer stating that "for all the members of the PWHPA — who, I would say, 80 per cent of them don't even know her — everyone hates her." In October 2020, Rylan stepped down as NWHL commissioner as the league announced a change in structure.

There have been a number of players who have switched from one organization to the other, such as Elaine Chuli leaving the PWHPA to sign with the Toronto Six in the 2020 off-season and Nicole Schammel leaving the Minnesota Whitecaps to join the PWHPA.

In 2021, the NWHL rebranded as the Premier Hockey Federation (PHF) and increased player pay in both the following seasons.

References

External links
 PWHPA website

Women's ice hockey
2019 establishments in Pennsylvania
Organizations established in 2019
Sports trade unions
Sports trade unions of the United States
501(c)(6) nonprofit organizations